Gourock Outdoor Pool is a salt water public lido in Gourock, Inverclyde, Scotland. It is the oldest heated swimming pool in Scotland.

Description 

The pool is heated and uses salt water taken from the Firth of Clyde. Facilities include a gym and a children's pool. The lido opens from May to the first week in September.

The pool is managed by Inverclyde Leisure.

History 

The lido was opened in 1909, and the water heating system was installed in 1969.

The pool was closed at the end of the 2010 summer season for a major improvement project, which was completed before the end of 2011. The existing changing accommodation was replaced with a more modern leisure centre, incorporating an enlarged gymnasium and lift access from the street level down to the new changing accommodation and the upgraded pool.

References

External links 

 
 Lidos in the UK

Lidos
Swimming venues in Scotland
Sports venues in Renfrewshire
1909 establishments in Scotland
Tourist attractions in Inverclyde
Gourock
Sports venues completed in 1909